Phra is a Thai term that may refer to:

Phra, a Thai-language term for Buddhist monk
Phra, a Thai-language term for priest
Phra, a Thai-language word used as a prefix denoting holy or royal status, including in Thai royal ranks and titles
Phra, a Thai noble title

Other uses
 Francesco "Phra" Barbaglia, Italian DJ and producer; see Crookers